Arbat District is a district of Central Administrative Okrug of the federal city of Moscow, Russia. Population:  

The district extends from central Mokhovaya Street west to Novoarbatsky Bridge over the Moskva River. Its irregular boundaries correspond roughly to Znamenka Street and Sivtsev Vrazhek Lane in the south and Povarskaya Street in the north. Main radial streets are Vozdvizhenka Street, New Arbat Street and pedestrian Arbat Street.

Economy

Aeroflot has its head office in the district.

See also
Arbat Street
Spaso House, residence of the US ambassador

References

External links
 Official website of Arbat District

 
Central Administrative Okrug